Countess Natalia Kirillovna Zagryazhskaya (née Razumovskaya; 5 September 1747 – 19 May 1837) was a Russian philanthropist, salonist and lady-in-waiting. She was a leading member of Saint Petersburg society from the 1770s until her death in 1837 and is often mentioned in contemporary memoirs and diaries.

She was the daughter of Kirill Razumovsky, the last hetman of Ukraine, and Yekaterina Ivanova Narysykina; her brother was the diplomat Andrey Razumovsky. In 1762 she became a lady-in-waiting to Empress Catherine the Great, and – in contrast to other ladies-in-waiting – was allowed to live at home. In 1772 she married officer Nikolai Zagryazhsky (1743–1821), but their relationship soon ended and they lived their lives apart. She was a friend of Empress Maria Fyodorovna and in 1798 was given the order of Catherine. A frequent host of members of the Imperial family, she was known as a contact person who could successfully ask them for favours on others' behalf. The poets Vasily Zhukovsky, Pyotr Vyazemsky and Alexander Pushkin were guests at her salon.

Her niece and adoptive daughter Maria was the mother of Natalia Goncharova, Pushkin's wife.

References 

1747 births
1837 deaths
Ladies-in-waiting from the Russian Empire
Philanthropists from the Russian Empire
Salon holders from the Russian Empire
Countesses of the Russian Empire
Burials at Lazarevskoe Cemetery (Saint Petersburg)
Burials at the Dukhovskaya Church